Jordan Stratford is a Canadian author of children's fiction.

Books

Children's books
Jordan is the author of the Wollstonecraft Detective Agency Series (Knopf / Random House), a pro-math and science adventure series for children 8-12. The first book was funded by a Kickstarter campaign that exceeded its target $4000, being promoted on Wired and io9. 

The first book in the series, The Case of the Missing Moonstone, sold 40,000 copies worldwide, and was translated into Russian, German and Turkish; it was a finalist for the Sheila A. Egoff Children's Literature Prize (part of the British Columbia Book Prizes) and the Silver Birch Award (part of the Forest of Reading, created by the Ontario Library Association). The second novel in the series, The Case of the Girl In Grey, was released in 2016, followed by The Case of the Counterfeit Criminals in 2017, and The Case of the Perilous Palace in 2018.

All of the Wollstonecraft Detective Agency books are illustrated by Kelly Murphy. The title refers to Mary Wollstonecraft, and the protagonists are based on Mary Shelley and Ada Lovelace.
2018 - The Case of the Perilous Palace
2017 - The Case of the Counterfeit Criminals
2016 - The Case of the Girl in Grey
2015 - The Case of the Missing Moonstone

Adult books
2011 - A Dictionary of Western Alchemy, Quest Books, 2007, 
2007 - Living Gnosticism, Apocryphile Press, 2007,

Personal life
In 2005, Stratford was ordained a gnostic priest in the Apostolic Johannite Church, having received a Licentiate of Sacred Theology from St. Raphael the Archangel Theological Seminary. He has written extensively on gnosticism as a modern spiritual practice and on the history of alchemy.

Stratford has also worked as an advertising creative director, filmmaker, screenwriter, instructor at Vancouver Film School and writer for the Canadian Broadcasting Corporation.

Stratford cites poet Robin Skelton as an influence.

Stratford is a father of four children.

Steampunk 
Jordan Stratford has been involved in steampunk for many years. He co-founded the Victoria Steam Expo, the first steampunk art exhibition in Canada. Vintage Tomorrows, a documentary about the movement, interviewed him at the 2012 event, which he described as "an interactive art experience" The film quotes him encouraging people to engage with technology, make it, break it, and reinvent it. CNET described his children's series, the Wollstonecraft Detective Agency novels, as steampunk plus Jane Austen.

References

External links

Official website

Canadian religious writers
Canadian children's writers